Rhynchosia volubilis is a plant species in the genus Rhynchosia.

Tergallic acid dilactone can be found in R. volubilis seeds.

References

External links

volubilis
Plants described in 1790